The Fab 40 (or Fab Forty) was the playlist for the station Wonderful Radio London.  Also known as Big L, Wonderful Radio London was a pirate radio station that operated from the MV Galaxy about three-and-a-half miles out from the coast of Frinton-on-Sea, Essex. It was founded by American Don Pierson with a backing of around £500,000, and first aired shortly before Christmas 1964. The station is credited with introducing to Britain the contemporary hit radio style seen in the United States and the Fab 40 chart is said by Music Week to have been "influential". During its tenure, it had disc jockeys such as John Peel, Tony Blackburn and Kenny Everett. Based on airplay (not physical music sales) the chart was broadcast on Sunday afternoons. The station closed on 14 August 1967 when the Marine Broadcasting Offences Act came into effect, with the last Fab 40 chart show presented the previous week by Tommy Vance. Later, when an official chart had been established, rival charts would factor airplay into their charts.

The Fab 40 had a significantly higher turnover of singles than the Record Retailer chart; it had 118 different singles top the chart between 23 January 1965 and 12 August 1967 (by comparison Record Retailer had 53). Additionally, only one single spent three weeks at number one – The Beatles double A-side "Day Tripper" / "We Can Work It Out" – while on the Record Retailer chart, 23 singles spent at least three weeks at the top of the chart in the same period. On the Fab 40, The Beatles and The Rolling Stones each had eight number-ones and The Hollies had seven (six of which did not top the Retailer chart).



Number-one singles

Key

 – The song did not reach number one on the Record Retailer chart which is considered by The Official Charts Company as the canonical source until 15 February 1969.
  – The song spent a week at number one where it shared the top spot with another song.

Notes

References

Lists of number-one songs in the United Kingdom